Durvalumab, sold under the brand name Imfinzi, is  an FDA-approved immunotherapy for cancer, developed by Medimmune/AstraZeneca. It is a human immunoglobulin G1 kappa (IgG1κ) monoclonal antibody that blocks the interaction of programmed cell death ligand 1 (PD-L1) with the PD-1 (CD279).

Durvalumab is known as an immune checkpoint inhibitor drug.

Medical uses 
The US Food and Drug Administration (FDA) has approved durvalumab for certain types of bladder, lung, and biliary tract cancer:
 Adults with locally advanced or metastatic urothelial carcinoma who either have disease progression during or following platinum-containing chemotherapy or have disease progression within 12 months of neoadjuvant or adjuvant treatment with platinum-containing chemotherapy.
 Adults with unresectable, Stage III non-small cell lung cancer whose disease has not progressed following concurrent platinum-based chemotherapy and radiation therapy.
 In combination with etoposide and either carboplatin or cisplatin, as first-line treatment for adults with extensive-stage small cell lung cancer.
 In combination with gemcitabine and cisplatin for adults with locally advanced or metastatic biliary tract cancer (BTC).

Clinical trials
A phase IB clinical trial of durvalumab and tremelimumab showed some activity in non-small cell lung cancer (NSCLC) Phase 1 data in advanced metastatic urothelial bladder (Study 1108) has led to FDA breakthrough therapy  designation. Early results of a phase I trial combining durvalumab and gefitinib in lung cancer patients "showed promise". A phase I clinical trial is currently underway using durvalumab with a TLR 7/8 agonist (MEDI 9197) for solid tumors. A Phase 1b/2a trial is underway combining durvalumab with an HPV DNA vaccine (MEDI 0457) in patients with HPV-associated recurrent/metastatic head and neck cancer.

MYSTIC 
In July 2017, AstraZeneca announced that a phase III trial of durvalumab with tremelimumab as a first-line treatment of non-small cell lung cancer failed to meet its primary endpoint of progression-free survival.

PACIFIC 
In November 2017, the double-blinded phase III AstraZeneca PACIFIC clinical trial demonstrated the efficacy of durvalumab in the treatment of stage III non-small cell lung cancer. 709 patients with stage III NSCLC who did not have disease progression after two or more cycles of a platinum-based chemotherapy were randomly assigned to receive durvalumab or a placebo as consolidation therapy for their lung cancer. Durvalumab increased the median progression-free survival from 5.6 months (placebo) to 16.8 months (durvalumab); the 12 month progression-free survival rate was increased from 35.3% (placebo) to 55.9% (durvalumab), and the 18 month progression-free survival rate was increased from 27.0% (placebo) to 44.2% (durvalumab). The median time to death or distant metastases was also increased from 14.6 months (placebo) to 23.2 months (durvalumab). Extreme side effects were also increased from 26.1% of patients (placebo) to 29.9% of patients (durvalumab).

CASPIAN 
In March 2021, the open-label, sponsor-blind (AstraZeneca), randomised, controlled phase 3 trial at 209 cancer treatment centres in 23 countries worldwide (CASPIAN) demonstrated the efficacy of durvalumab in combination with platinum-based chemotherapy in the treatment of small cell lung cancer.
Between March 27, 2017, and May 29, 2018, 972 patients were screened and 805 were randomly assigned (268 to durvalumab plus tremelimumab plus platinum–etoposide, 268 to durvalumab plus platinum–etoposide, and 269 to platinum–etoposide). As of Jan 27, 2020, the median follow-up was 25·1 months (IQR 22·3–27·9). Durvalumab plus tremelimumab plus platinum–etoposide was not associated with a significant improvement in overall survival versus platinum–etoposide (hazard ratio [HR] 0·82 [95% CI 0·68–1·00]; p=0·045); median overall survival was 10·4 months (95% CI 9·6–12·0) versus 10·5 months (9·3–11·2). Durvalumab plus platinum–etoposide showed sustained improvement in overall survival versus platinum–etoposide (HR 0·75 [95% CI 0·62–0·91]; nominal p=0·0032); median overall survival was 12·9 months (95% CI 11·3–14·7) versus 10·5 months (9·3–11·2). The most common any-cause grade 3 or worse adverse events were neutropenia (85 [32%] of 266 patients in the durvalumab plus tremelimumab plus platinum–etoposide group, 64 [24%] of 265 patients in the durvalumab plus platinum–etoposide group, and 88 [33%] of 266 patients in the platinum–etoposide group) and anaemia (34 [13%], 24 [9%], and 48 [18%]). Any-cause serious adverse events were reported in 121 (45%) patients in the durvalumab plus tremelimumab plus platinum–etoposide group, 85 (32%) in the durvalumab plus platinum–etoposide group, and 97 (36%) in the platinum–etoposide group. Treatment-related deaths occurred in 12 (5%) patients in the durvalumab plus tremelimumab plus platinum–etoposide group (death, febrile neutropenia, and pulmonary embolism [n=2 each]; enterocolitis, general physical health deterioration and multiple organ dysfunction syndrome, pneumonia, pneumonitis and hepatitis, respiratory failure, and sudden death [n=1 each]), six (2%) patients in the durvalumab plus platinum–etoposide group (cardiac arrest, dehydration, hepatotoxicity, interstitial lung disease, pancytopenia, and sepsis [n=1 each]), and two (1%) in the platinum–etoposide group (pancytopenia and thrombocytopenia [n=1 each]).

TOPAZ 
Efficacy was evaluated in TOPAZ-1 (NCT03875235), a randomized, double-blind, placebo-controlled, multiregional trial that enrolled 685 patients with histologically confirmed locally advanced unresectable or metastatic BTC who had not previously received systemic therapy for advanced disease.

Trial demographics were as follows: 56% Asian, 37% White, 2% Black, and 4% other race; 7% Hispanic or Latino; 50% male and 50% female; median age was 64 years (range 20-85) and 47% were 65 years or older. Fifty-six percent had intrahepatic cholangiocarcinoma, 25% had gallbladder cancer, and 19% had extrahepatic cholangiocarcinoma.

The major efficacy outcome measure was overall survival (OS). Tumor assessments were conducted every 6 weeks for the first 24 weeks, then every 8 weeks until confirmed objective disease progression. A statistically significant improvement in OS was demonstrated in patients randomized to receive durvalumab with gemcitabine and cisplatin compared to those randomized to receive placebo with gemcitabine and cisplatin. Median OS was 12.8 months (95% CI: 11.1, 14) and 11.5 months (95% CI: 10.1, 12.5) in the durvalumab and placebo arms, respectively (hazard ratio 0.80; 95% CI: 0.66, 0.97, p=0.021). The median progression-free survival was 7.2 months (95% CI: 6.7, 7.4) and 5.7 months (95% CI: 5.6, 6.7) in the durvalumab and placebo arms, respectively. Investigator-assessed overall response rate was 27% (95% CI: 22% - 32%) and 19% (95% CI: 15%-23%) in the durvalumab and placebo arms, respectively.

References

External links
 
 
 

Breakthrough therapy
Antineoplastic drugs
Monoclonal antibodies
AstraZeneca brands
Orphan drugs